Ffridd Gate was a station on the Corris Railway in Merioneth (now Gwynedd), Wales, UK. It was built at the level crossing over the B4404 road to Llanwrin, near the hamlet of Fridd. A small hamlet also grew up around the station and a nearby (pre-existent) toll-house.

History 
Around 1830  a toll house was built at Ffridd Gate to control the south end of the turnpike road to Dolgellau - now the A487. When the Corris, Machynlleth & River Dovey Tramroad was built in 1859, it crossed the road to Llanwrin (now the B4404) and passed on the east side of the tollhouse before entering Ffridd Wood. The station, built in 1885, was on the south side of the level crossing and had a simple wooden shelter for passengers. There was no platform.

Positioning 
South of the station was the railway's bridge over the Dyfi, originally a wooden trestle construction and later a three-span steel bridge. The site of the bridge is now occupied by the Millennium Bridge for walkers and cyclists, providing a short-cut to Machynlleth.

The Centre for Alternative Technology lies about a mile north of the hamlet.

Description

References

External links
 The Fridd-Gate tollhouse's entry on the National Monuments Record of Wales (NMRW)'s website
 Centre for Alternative Technology
 Eco Dyfi Valley Partnership

Disused railway stations in Gwynedd
Corris Railway
Corris
Railway stations in Great Britain opened in 1887
Railway stations in Great Britain closed in 1931